George Taylor Ramsden (6 April 1879 – 9 October 1936) was a British parliamentarian.

As Lieutenant George Taylor Ramsden he was elected as a Coalition Unionist member of parliament for Elland in 1918, defeating the sitting Liberal member Charles Trevelyan (who was running as a Labour Independent). He lost the seat to Labour in 1922. He died aged 57 in 1936 in his house in Boston Spa, and was survived by his wife Elizabeth.

References
 Death Notices, The Times, Tuesday, 13 October 1936

External links 
 

1879 births
1936 deaths
Conservative Party (UK) MPs for English constituencies
UK MPs 1918–1922
Place of birth missing